Nothobranchius flagrans is a species of brightly coloured killifish in the family Nothobranchiidae. This species is endemic to south-eastern Democratic Republic of Congo. It is currently known from temporary swamps in the Dikuluwe system in the lower Lufira River drainage.

Sources

Links
 Nothobranchius flagrans on WildNothos

flagrans
Fish described in 2014
Fish of the Democratic Republic of the Congo